This is a list of U.S. state dinosaurs in the United States, including the District of Columbia. Many states also have dinosaurs as state fossils, or designate named avian dinosaurs (List of U.S. state birds), but this list only includes those that have been officially designated as "state dinosaurs".


List of dinosaurs for states and other regions in the US

List of candidate dinosaurs 
This is for dinosaurs that were or are candidates for state dinosaur but either were not designated or have yet to officially be.

See also
 List of U.S. state fossils
 Lists of U.S. state insignia

References

External links
 "The sort of official state dinosaur page. Dinosaur Interplanetary Gazette. (note that the list includes both "state dinosaurs" and "state fossils")

U.S. state dinosaurs
Dinosaurs
.States
.State